Séniergues is a commune in the Lot department in south-western France.

Geography
The river Céou has its source in the commune and forms part of its southern border.

See also
Communes of the Lot department

References

Communes of Lot (department)